The American Athletic Conference women's soccer tournament is the conference championship tournament in soccer for the American Athletic Conference.  The tournament has been held every year since the split from the Big East Conference in 2013.  It is a single-elimination tournament and seeding is based on regular season records. The winner, declared conference champion, receives the conference's automatic bid to the NCAA Division I Women's Soccer Championship.

Format
The teams are seeded based on the order of finish in the conference's round robin regular season.  Tiebreakers begin with the result of the head-to-head matchup.  The teams are then placed in a single-elimination bracket, with the top seed playing the lowest seed, until meeting in a final championship game.  After two overtime period, ties are broken by shootout rounds, with the winner of the shootout advancing.

Champions

By year

By school
This table of championship statistics is updated after each event.  It is current as of the end of the 2022 Tournament.

Teams in italics no longer sponsor women's soccer in the American.

References

 
NCAA Division I women's soccer conference tournaments